is a Japanese announcer and tarento. He was born in Kamigamo Shrine of the Shinto shrine of bushi samurais. After being a Tokyo Broadcasting System (TBS) announcer he later became a free announcer.

Suzuki is nicknamed .

Nanjing Massacre denial

Suzuki denied Nanjing Massacre.

Filmography

As a TBS announcer
News, informal, and documentaries

Music, quiz, variety programmes

TV drama

TV anime

Non-genre

Radio

As a free announcer

Advertisements

Books

Discography

Others

References

External links
 
 (Wayback Machine) 
Oricon profile 

Lecturer profiles
Kouen Irai profile 
System Brain profile 

CMA profiles (Wayback Machine)
Profile from 2003–07 
Profile from 2007–09 

Interviews
Tub House interview 

Japanese television presenters
Japanese journalists
Japanese theatre directors
Japanese television directors
Japanese television personalities
Japanese male actors
Nanjing Massacre deniers
People from Kyoto
Waseda University alumni
1938 births
Living people